Rafael Ferrando (born 1966) is a Spanish astronomer, credited by the Minor Planet Center with the discovery of numerous minor planets between 2001 and 2010.

The main-belt asteroid 161545 Ferrando, discovered by Juan Lacruz, was named after him on 24 November 2007.

List of discovered minor planets

References 
 

1966 births
Discoverers of minor planets

Living people
21st-century Spanish astronomers